Lake Tihu is a lake of Estonia.

See also
List of lakes of Estonia

Tihu
Hiiumaa Parish
Landforms of Hiiu County